Siena Goines (born March 28, 1969) is an American film and television actress. She has guest-starred on the soap opera Passions, the police drama The Division and the medical drama Private Practice.

History
Goines was born in Washington, D.C. From 1998 to 2000, Goines played the role of Callie Rogers on the CBS daytime soap opera, The Young and the Restless where she earned an NAACP Image Award nomination for Outstanding Actress in a Daytime Drama. From 2000 to 2004, Goines played the recurring role of Mia on another CBS drama, Judging Amy. The actress has made a name for herself appearing on TV series including Charmed, Chicago Hope, and The Magnificent Seven.

In 2004 Goines appeared in Ellen DeGeneres' My Short Film for American Express in 2004. In 2007, she had a recurring role on the CBS drama Jericho as  Sarah Mason.

She appeared in The Sweetest Thing (2002), Rancid (2004), The 40-Year-Old Virgin (2005) and Nina (2015).

Filmography

Film

Television

External links

Actresses from Washington, D.C.
African-American actresses
American television actresses
American soap opera actresses
American film actresses
1969 births
Living people
21st-century African-American people
21st-century African-American women
20th-century African-American people
20th-century African-American women